Dongfang Road or Dongfang Lu (pinyin: Dōngfāng Lù) is a major road in Pudong New District of Shanghai.

Dongfang Road was formerly known as Wendeng Road which was named after Wendeng of Shandong Province.

History 
Dongfang Road was firstly established in the late 1950s to accommodate the planning and construction of new residential areas nearby. The road was extended several times along with the urban development of Pudong. In 1994, the road was renamed to Dongfang Road from Wendeng Road after the establishment of Shanghai Oriental TV building.

Transportation

Ferry 
Qiqing Ferry is located at the north end of the road.

Metro 
 Shanghai Metro Line 4: Dongfang Road, Pudong Avenue Station, Century Avenue Station.
 Shanghai Metro Line 6: lCentury Avenue Station, Pudian Road Station, Blue Village Road Station, Shanghai Children's Medical Center Station, Linyi Village Station.

Major Landmarks 
 Renji Hospital
 Shanghai Children's Medical Center
 Shijihui (under construction)

External links 
 Renji Hospital
 Shanghai Children's Medical Center
 Shanghai Metro Line 4
 Shanghai Metro Line 6

References 

Roads in China